Kahalekuiokalani Michael Wodehouse "Kahale" Warring (born March 23, 1997) is an American football tight end for the DC Defenders of the XFL. He played college football at San Diego State and was drafted by the Houston Texans in the third round of the 2019 NFL Draft.

Professional career

Houston Texans
Warring was drafted by the Houston Texans in the third round (86th overall) of the 2019 NFL Draft. On September 2, 2019, Warring was placed on injured reserve.

On September 15, 2020, Warring was placed on injured reserve. He was activated on November 23, 2020.

The Texans waived Warring on August 23, 2021.

New England Patriots
On August 24, 2021, Warring was claimed off waivers by the New England Patriots, but was waived just three days later.

Indianapolis Colts
On August 28, 2021, Warring was claimed off waivers by the Indianapolis Colts. He was waived on August 31, 2021.

Buffalo Bills 
On September 2, 2021, Warring was signed to the Buffalo Bills practice squad.

Jacksonville Jaguars
On December 28, 2021, Warring was signed by the Jacksonville Jaguars off the Bills practice squad.

New Orleans Saints
On May 24, 2022, Warring signed with the New Orleans Saints. He was waived on June 22, 2022.

DC Defenders 
On November 17, 2022, Warring was drafted by the DC Defenders of the XFL.

References

External links
San Diego State Aztecs bio

1997 births
Living people
American football tight ends
People from Sonora, California
Players of American football from California
San Diego State Aztecs football players
Houston Texans players
New England Patriots players
Indianapolis Colts players
Buffalo Bills players
Jacksonville Jaguars players
New Orleans Saints players
DC Defenders players